Waseda El Dorado, also known as Rhythms of Vision, is a building designed by the Japanese architect Von Jour Caux and built in August, 1983. It is located near the Waseda University campus in Shinjuku, Tokyo, Japan.

The building design is a mixture of revival Art Nouveau (or Arts and Crafts) and Japanese culture. Its interior features a Buddhist stave's giant hand pointing down from a ceiling of stained glass. The curving wrought-iron balconies take the form of lily pads, and the wrought-iron banister gracefully zigzags past elegant Art Deco stained-glass windows. Tattoo-designs adorn the ceramic figures, green-gold wallpaper is imprinted by Edo-style woodblocks, and iridescent tiles reflect the art of inlaid mother-of-pearl.

Gallery

External links

 Waseda El Dorado at the Official site of Von Jour Caux
 The architecture of Tōkyō by Hiroshi Watanabe

Waseda University buildings
Art Nouveau architecture in Japan
Art Nouveau educational buildings
Buildings and structures completed in 1983
1983 establishments in Japan